Down the Wire is the thirty-first album by Spyro Gyra, released on April 28, 2009. It was nominated for a Grammy Award for Best Pop Instrumental Album in 2010. Down the Wire peaked at No. 9 on the jazz album chart at Billboard magazine.

Track listing

Personnel 

Spyro Gyra
 Jay Beckenstein – saxophones
 Tom Schuman – keyboards
 Julio Fernández – guitars
 Scott Ambush – bass guitar
 Bonny Bonaparte – drums, percussion, vocals

Additional musicians
 Gerardo Velez – percussion (2, 7), horn (8)
 Marc Quiñones – percussion (8)
 Bill Harris – tenor saxophone, flute
 Ozzie Melendez – trombone
 Don Harris – trumpet

Production 
 Jay Beckenstein – producer 
 Dave Love – executive producer 
 Mike Brylinsky – engineer 
 Justin Rose – engineer
 Martin Walters – mixing, mastering 
 Natalie Singer – producer manager 
 Robert Hoffman – art direction, design, photography

References

2009 albums
Spyro Gyra albums
Heads Up International albums